Aleksandr Vasin is a Russian basketball coach of the Russian national team, which he coached at the EuroBasket Women 2017.

References

Living people
Russian basketball coaches
Year of birth missing (living people)
Place of birth missing (living people)
BC Zenit Saint Petersburg coaches